The Faraday Medal is awarded by the Electrochemistry Group of the Royal Society of Chemistry. Since 1977, it honours distinguished mid-career   electrochemists working outside of the United Kingdom and the Republic of Ireland for their research advancements.

Laureates
Source: RIC

 1977 Veniamin Grigorievich Levich (1917–1987)
 1981 John O’M. Bockris
 1983 Jean-Michel Savéant
 1985 Michel Armand
 1987 Heinz Gerischer (1919–1994)
 1991 David A. J. Rand, CSIRO Division of Mineral Chemistry, Port Melbourne
 1994 Stanley Bruckenstein, University at Buffalo 
 1995 Michael J. Weaver (1947–2002), Purdue University
 1996 Adam Heller, University of Texas
 1998 Wolf Vielstich, Universität Bonn
 1999 Philippe Allongue, CNRS
 2000 Alan Maxwell Bond (b. 1946), Monash University 
 2001 Michael Grätzel, École polytechnique fédérale de Lausanne
 2002 Henry S. White, University of Utah 
 2003  (1942–2011), Universität Ulm
 2004 Daniel A. Scherson, Case Western Reserve University
 2005 Robert Mark Wightman, University of North Carolina
 2006 Hubert H. Girault, École polytechnique fédérale de Lausanne
 2007 Christian Amatore, CNRS
 2008 Nathan Lewis, California Institute of Technology
 2009 Reginald M. Penner, University of California, Irvine
 2011 Héctor D. Abruña, Cornell University
 2012 Zhong-Qun Tian, Xiamen University
 2013 Nenad Markovic
 2014 Masatoshi Osawa, Hokkaido University
 2015 Richard M. Crooks, University of Texas at Austin
 2016 Justin Gooding, University of New South Wales, Australia 
 2017 Marc Koper, Leiden University 
 2018 Yang Shao-Horn, MIT
 2019 Martin Winter, Westfälische Wilhelms-Universität Münster
 2020 Shirley Meng, University of California, San Diego
 2021 Peter Strasser, Technical University of Berlin
 2022 Beatriz Roldán Cuenya, Fritz-Haber-Institute, Berlin

See also

 List of chemistry awards

References

1977 establishments in the United Kingdom
Awards of the Royal Society of Chemistry
Electrochemistry